The Taiyuan Ancient Mosque is a mosque in Xinghualing District, Taiyuan City, Shanxi Province, China.

History
The mosque was originally called the Qingxiu Mosque and was established in the 8th century during the Tang Dynasty. It then went several renovations and reconstructions after 11th century. The existing building was mainly built during the Ming Dynasty.

Architecture
The mosque has the traditional Chinese architecture style and consists of two courtyards. The main buildings include the gate, prayer hall, sermon hall, decorated archway, ablution hall etc. The prayer hall combines the traditional Chinese, Arabic and Islamic architecture style.

Transportation
The mosque is accessible west from Taiyuan Railway Station.

See also
 Islam in China
 List of mosques in China

References

8th-century mosques
Buildings and structures in Shanxi